The Märkische Allgemeine (also known as the MAZ) is a regional, daily newspaper published by the Märkische Verlags- und Druckgesellschaft mbH for the area in and around the state capital of Brandenburg, Potsdam in Germany.

The newspaper was created in 1946 by the merger of Volkswille and Der Märker and took on its current name on German Unity Day, 3 October 1990.

References

External links 
  

Mass media in Potsdam
Daily newspapers published in Germany
German-language newspapers
Newspapers established in 1946
German news websites